The Burj Nahaar, is a horse race run over a distance of 1,600 metres (one mile) on dirt in March at Meydan Racecourse in Dubai. The race is named after the Burj Nahar, a fortified tower on Dubai's old city walls.

The Burj Nahaar was first contested in 2002 at Nad Al Sheba Racecourse. It became a Listed race in 2005 and was elevated to Group 3 level a year later. The race was relocated to Meydan in 2010 where it was run on a synthetic Tapeta surface before reverting to dirt in 2015.

Records
Record time:
1:34.99 - Muntazah 2019

Most successful horse (2 wins):
 2 - African Story – 2012, 2013

Most wins by a jockey:
 3 - Frankie Dettori – 2003, 2011, 2012
 3 - Mickael Barzalona – 2013, 2014, 2017

Most wins by a trainer:
 6 - Saeed bin Suroor 2003, 2008, 2011, 2012, 2013, 2014

Most wins by an owner:
 4 - Hamdan Al Maktoum 2003, 2009, 2015, 2019
 4 - Godolphin 2008, 2012, 2013, 2014

Winners

See also
 List of United Arab Emirates horse races

References

Horse races in the United Arab Emirates
Recurring events established in 2002
2002 establishments in the United Arab Emirates